Ashraf Ibrahim Atwa Megahed (born 1961) is an Egyptian Vice admiral and the current commander of the Egyptian Navy. Before he assumed the office in December 2021, he served as chief of staff of the Navy.

Megahed obtained his graduation in 1983 with a bachelor's decree in maritime studies and master's in military studies.

His previous assessments includes commander of the Southern Fleet, in addition to serving as commander of the naval bases stationed at the Port Said and the Red Sea.

Awards and distinctions 
 Medal of Military Duty
 Medal of Long Service
 Medal of Good Example
 Medal of Distinguished Service
 Medal of 25 January
 Medal of 30 June

References 

1961 births
Egyptian Navy admirals
Place of birth missing (living people)
Living people